The 2018–19 South Florida Bulls women's basketball team will represent the University of South Florida in the 2018–19 NCAA Division I women's basketball season. The Bulls, coached by Jose Fernandez in his nineteenth season, play their home games at Yuengling Center in Tampa, Florida. This will be USF's sixth season as a member of the American Athletic Conference, known as The American or AAC. They finished the season 19–16, 7–9 in AAC play to finish in a tie for fifth place. They advanced to the semifinals of the American Athletic Conference women's tournament, where they lost to Connecticut. They received at-large bid to the WNIT where defeated Stetson in the first round before losing to James Madison in the second round.

Media
All Bulls games will air on Bullscast Radio or CBS 1010 AM. Conference home games will rotate between ESPN3, AAC Digital, and Bullscast. Road games will typically be streamed on the opponents website, though conference road games could also appear on ESPN3 or AAC Digital.

Roster

Schedule

|-
!colspan=9 style=| Non-conference regular season

|-
!colspan=9 style=| AAC regular season

|-
!colspan=12 style="background:#006747;"|AAC Women's tournament

|-
!colspan=12 style="background:#006747;"|WNIT

Rankings

^Coaches did not release a Week 2 poll.

See also
2018–19 South Florida Bulls men's basketball team

References

South Florida Bulls women's basketball seasons
South Florida
South Florida